God Did is the thirteenth studio album by American record producer DJ Khaled, released through We the Best Music and Epic Records on August 26, 2022. The record project earned five nominations at the 65th Annual Grammy Awards, including for Best Rap Album, and Song of the Year and Best Rap Song for the title track, featuring Rick Ross, Lil Wayne, Jay-Z, John Legend and Fridayy.

It was supported by two singles: the Drake and Lil Baby-assisted "Staying Alive", and the Future and Lil Baby-assisted "Big Time".

Background
According to Khaled, the album thematizes the constant quest to relate to and praise a higher God for believing in him when others did not and he has been very open and proudly admitted to being a Muslim who habitually prays. "God has always told me to keep going; [...] When times get hard, I go harder. When times get great, I go even harder. I don't waste my emotions and energy on moving backwards. I use my energy to find the solution to keep going. If something ain't workin' out the way it's supposed to work out, [...] I want to find a way to get back up and keep going and find the solution."

The project serves as the follow-up to his previous album, Khaled Khaled, released a year prior.

The album features guest appearances from Drake, Rick Ross, Lil Wayne, Jay-Z, John Legend, Fridayy, Kanye West, Eminem, Future, Lil Baby, Lil Durk, 21 Savage, Roddy Ricch, Quavo, Takeoff, SZA, Nardo Wick, Kodak Black, Don Toliver, Travis Scott, Gunna, Latto, City Girls, Skillibeng, Buju Banton, Capleton, Bounty Killer, Sizzla, Jadakiss, Vory, and Juice WRLD.

Critical reception

God Did received generally mixed-to-negative reviews from critics. On Metacritic, based on 6 reviews, the album received a score of 43, the lowest of DJ Khaled's career.

Clash called the album a "bombastic return from the hip-hop high-roller". Dani Blum of Pitchfork described the project as a "bogged-down album" in which "some of the album’s most appealing melodies and hooks seem more incidental than intentional, the logical outcome of combining stars and beats, then backing away". Blum characterized DJ Khaled as incompetent to harness "the power of collaboration to push artists beyond their comfort zones", with the exception of the title track with Jay-Z, which was praised as "ambitious".

Although the album as a whole generated little enthusiasm from critics, Jay-Z's performance on the track "God Did" received critical acclaim. Simon Vozick-Levinson of Rolling Stone called the verse "a master class in mature lyricism", while Complex wrote that "the long-teased verse is a reminder that he's still an exceptional writer" and that "this verse will definitely go down among Jay-Z's best". An Ambrosia For Heads article called Jay-Z's verse the best verse of 2022.

Commercial performance
God Did debuted at number one on the US Billboard 200 chart, earning 107,500 album-equivalent units (including 9,500 copies in pure album sales) in its first week.

Track listing

Notes 
  signifies a co-producer

Sample credits
 "Staying Alive" contains samples from the similarly titled "Stayin' Alive", written by Barry Gibb, Robin Gibb, and Maurice Gibb, and performed by the Bee Gees.
 "Party" contains samples from "Party All the Time", written by Rick James, and performed by Eddie Murphy.
 "Jadakiss Interlude" contains samples from "New York", written by Ja Rule, Fat Joe, Cool & Dre, KRS-One, and Jadakiss, and performed by Ja Rule, featuring Fat Joe, and Jadakiss.
 "Bills Paid" contains samples from "Lights, Camera, Action!" written by Terrance Kelly and performed by Mr. Cheeks

Charts

Weekly charts

Year-end charts

References

2022 albums
Albums produced by DJ Khaled
DJ Khaled albums
Albums produced by Tay Keith
Albums produced by Timbaland
Albums produced by TM88
Albums produced by Mike Dean (record producer)
Albums produced by Nick Mira
Albums produced by Dr. Dre
Trap music albums